The 2016 United States presidential election in Wyoming was held on November 8, 2016, as part of the 2016 United States presidential election in which all 50 states plus the District of Columbia participated. Wyoming voters chose electors to represent them in the Electoral College via a popular vote pitting the Republican Party's nominee, businessman Donald Trump, and running mate Indiana Governor Mike Pence against Democratic Party nominee, former Secretary of State Hillary Clinton and her running mate, Virginia Senator Tim Kaine.

On March 1 and April 9, 2016, in the presidential primaries, Wyoming voters expressed their preferences for the Democratic, Republican, Libertarian, and Constitution parties' respective nominees for president. Registered members of each party only voted in their party's primary, while voters who were unaffiliated chose any one primary in which to vote. Prior to the election, Wyoming was considered to be a state Trump would win or a safe red state.

Donald Trump won the election in Wyoming with 67.4% of the vote. Hillary Clinton received 21.6% of the vote. Gary Johnson of the Libertarian Party received 5.1%. Wyoming, a solidly Republican state, has not voted for a Democrat in a presidential election since it went for Lyndon B. Johnson in 1964. Trump carried every county with the exception of Teton County. His 45.8-point margin over Clinton in the state not only made it the most Republican in the 2016 presidential election, but it is also the largest margin of victory by any presidential candidate in the state's history, besting Ronald Reagan's 42.3-point margin in 1984.

Primary elections

The incumbent President of the United States, Barack Obama, a Democrat and former U.S. Senator of Illinois, was first elected president in the 2008 election, running with former Senator Joe Biden of Delaware. Defeating the Republican nominee, Senator John McCain of Arizona, with 52.9% of the popular vote and 68% of the electoral vote, Obama succeeded two-term Republican President George W. Bush, the former Governor of Texas. Obama and Biden were reelected in the 2012 presidential election, defeating former Massachusetts Governor Mitt Romney with 51.1% of the popular vote and 61.7% of electoral votes. Since the end of 2009, polling companies such as Gallup have found Obama's approval ratings to be between 40 and 50 percent.

Following his second term, Barack Obama was not eligible for another reelection. In October 2015, Obama's running-mate and two-term Vice President Joe Biden decided not to enter the race for the Democratic presidential nomination either. With their term expiring on January 20, 2017, the electorate was asked to elect a new president, the 45th president and 48th vice president of the United States, respectively.

Republican caucuses

Democratic caucuses

General election

Voting History

Wyoming is the least populous of all 50 U.S. states. With almost 60% of the population identifying with or leaning towards the Republican Party, compared to less than 30% identifying with or leaning towards the Democrats, it is also the most solid Republican state, ahead of Idaho and Utah. In the 2012 presidential election, incumbent President Barack Obama received less than 28% of the votes, trailing Mitt Romney by more than 40 points.

Predictions

Results

County results
<div style="overflow:auto">
{| class="wikitable sortable" style="text-align:center"
|-
! colspan=1 |
! style="text-align:center;" colspan="2"| Donald Trump  Republican
! style="text-align:center;" colspan="2"| Hillary Clinton  Democratic
! style="text-align:center;" colspan="2"|
Gary Johnson  Libertarian
! style="text-align:center;" colspan="2"| 
Write Ins
! style="text-align:center;" colspan="2"|
Jill Stein  Green
! style="text-align:center;" colspan="2"|
Darrell Castle  Constitution
! style="text-align:center;" colspan="2"|
Rocky De La Fuente  Reform/ADP
! style="text-align:center;" colspan="2"| Margin
! style="text-align:center;" colspan="1"| Total
|-
! align="center" | County
! style="text-align:center;" data-sort-type="number" | Votes
! style="text-align:center;" data-sort-type="number" | %
! style="text-align:center;" data-sort-type="number" | Votes
! style="text-align:center;" data-sort-type="number" | %
! style="text-align:center;" data-sort-type="number" | Votes
! style="text-align:center;" data-sort-type="number" | %
! style="text-align:center;" data-sort-type="number" | Votes
! style="text-align:center;" data-sort-type="number" | %
! style="text-align:center;" data-sort-type="number" | Votes
! style="text-align:center;" data-sort-type="number" | %
! style="text-align:center;" data-sort-type="number" | Votes
! style="text-align:center;" data-sort-type="number" | %
! style="text-align:center;" data-sort-type="number" | Votes
! style="text-align:center;" data-sort-type="number" | %
! style="text-align:center;" data-sort-type="number" | Votes
! style="text-align:center;" data-sort-type="number" | %
! style="text-align:center;" data-sort-type="number" | Votes
|-
||Albany||7,602||44.56||6,890||40.39||1,391||8.15||637||3.73||344||2.02||133||0.78||63||0.37||712||4.17||17,060
|-
||Big Horn||4,067||76.49||604||11.36||242||4.55||236
||4.44||35||0.66||112||2.11||21||0.39||3,463||65.13||5,317
|-
||Campbell||15,778||86.70||1,324||7.28||653||3.59||264||1.45||66||0.36||86||0.47||28||0.15||14,454||79.42||18,199
|-
||Carbon||4,409||69.17||1,279||20.07||381||5.98||174||2.73||49||0.77||61||0.96||21||0.33||3,130||49.11||6,374
|-
||Converse||5,520||82.96||668||10.04||251||3.77||102||1.53||42||0.63||51||0.77||20||0.30||4,852||72.92||6,654
|-
||Crook||3,348||87.51||273||7.14||118||3.08||52||1.36||11||0.29||18||0.47||6||0.16||3,075||80.37||3,826
|-
||Fremont||11,167||65.60||4,200||24.67||773||4.54||480||2.82||233||1.37||110||0.65||60||0.35||6,967||40.93||17,023
|-
||Goshen||4,418||76.22||924||15.94||234||4.04||88||1.52||45||0.78||68||1.17||19||0.33||3,494||60.28||5,796
|-
||Hot Springs||1,939||74.98||400||15.47||136||5.26||51||1.97||35||1.35||21||0.81||4||0.15||1,539||59.51||2,586
|-
||Johnson||3,477||78.72||638||14.44||174||3.94||68||1.54||33||0.75||19||0.43||8||0.18||2,839||64.27||4,417
|-
||Laramie||24,847||60.21||11,573||28.04||2,657||6.44||1,019||2.47||434||1.05||324||0.79||115||0.28||13,274||32.16||41,269
|-
||Lincoln||6,779||76.38||1,105||12.45||331||3.73||477||5.37||48||0.54||112||1.26||23||0.26||5,674||63.93||8,875
|-
||Natrona||23,552||70.62||6,577||19.72||1,791||5.37||818||2.45||310||0.93||226||0.68||74||0.22||16,975||50.90||33,348
|-
||Niobrara||1,116||84.93||115||8.75||49||3.73||17||1.29||7||0.53||7||0.53||3||0.23||1,001||76.18||1,314
|-
||Park||11,115||73.63||2,535||16.79||625||4.14||461||3.05||151||1.00||153||1.01||55||0.36||8,580||56.84||15,095
|-
||Platte||3,437||75.89||719||15.88||180||3.97||69||1.52||36||0.79||82||1.81||6||0.13||2,718||60.01||4,529
|-
||Sheridan||10,266||70.75||2,927||20.17||729||5.02||322||2.22||158||1.09||76||0.52||32||0.22||7,339||50.58||14,510
|-
||Sublette||3,409||77.65||644||14.67||169||3.85||93||2.12||28||0.64||34||0.77||13||0.30||2,765||62.98||4,390
|-
||Sweetwater||12,154||70.95||3,231||18.86||928||5.42||470||2.74||152||0.89||130||0.76||65||0.38||8,923||52.09||17,130
|-
||Teton||3,921||31.05||7,314||57.92||701||5.55||449||3.56||172||1.36||43||0.34||27||0.21||−3,393||−26.87||12,627
|-
||Uinta||6,154||72.66||1,202||14.19||472||5.57||417||4.92||79||0.93||116||1.37||30||0.35||4,952||58.47||8,470
|-
||Washakie||2,911||76.32||532||13.94||194||5.09||99||2.60||37||0.97||31||0.81||10||0.26||2,379||62.38||3,814
|-
||Weston||3,033||86.02||299||8.48||108||3.06||41||1.16||10||0.28||29||0.82||6||0.17||2,734||77.54||3,526
|-
!State Total||174,419||68.17||55,973||21.88||13,287||5.19||6,904||2.70||2,515||0.98||2,042||0.80||709||0.28||118,446||46.30||255,849

By congressional district
Due to the state's low population, only one congressional district is allocated. This district is called the At-Large district, because it covers the entire state, and thus is equivalent to the statewide election results.

See also
 United States presidential elections in Wyoming
 Presidency of Donald Trump

References

External links
 RNC 2016 Republican Nominating Process 
 Green papers for 2016 primaries, caucuses, and conventions

Wy
2016
Presidential